The 2016 Esso Cup was Canada's eighth national women's midget hockey championship, contested April 17–23, 2016 at Weyburn, Saskatchewan. The Brantford Ice Cats from Ontario captured the national championship with a 10-3 victory over Québec's Express du Richelieu in the gold medal game. The Rocky Mountain Raiders of Alberta won the bronze medal game.

Teams

Round robin

Playoffs

Individual awards
 Most Valuable Player: Nicole Kelly (Brantford)
 Top Scorer: Nicole Kelly (Brantford)
 Top Forward: Nicole Kelly (Brantford)
 Top Defenceman: Paige Cohoon (Brantford)
 Top Goaltender: Kate Lloyd (Rocky Mountain)
 Most Sportsmanlike Player: Léonie Philbert (Richelieu)

Road to the Esso Cup

Atlantic Region
Tournament held March 31–April 3, 2016 at MacLauchlan Arena in Charlottetown, PEI.

Quebec
LHFDQ Midget AAA championship played April 2–3, 2016.

Ontario
The OWMA midget championship played April 7–10, 2016 at Toronto, Ontario

Western Region
Best-of-3 series played April 1 – 2, 2016 at Shoal Lake, Manitoba

Pacific Region
Best-of-3 series played April 1 – 2, 2016 at Prince George, British Columbia.

See also
 Esso Cup

References

External links
 2016 Esso Cup Home Page at HockeyCanada.com

Esso Cup
Esso Cup
Weyburn